Calea is a genus of flowering plants in the aster family, Asteraceae. They are distributed in tropical and subtropical regions in Mexico, Central America, and South America.

Extracts of Calea species have had antifungal, anti-inflammatory, cytotoxic, larvicidal, antiplasmodial, and antihypertensive effects in experiments. Some species are used in traditional medicine and ritual. Calea clematidea is used to treat influenza. Calea ternifolia is used in Mexico to treat dysentery and fever, and native peoples use it to influence their dreams.

 Species

 Names brought to synonymy
 Calea elegans DC., a synonym for Perymenium acuminatum, a plant found in Mexico

References

 
Asteraceae genera